The French surgeon, of Hungarian origin, Pierre Foldès (6 May 1951, Paris) is the inventor, in collaboration with the urologist Jean-Antoine Robein, of a clitoral restoration surgery technique to repair the damage caused by female genital mutilation. This technique repairs some of the urologic and obstetric problems related to FGC, and also may allow the women to experience more pleasure during sexual stimulation.

For the past 25 years, Foldès has worked to treat women who have experienced genital mutilation. He currently operates on approximately 200 women per year.
His procedure consists of the removal of any scar tissue from the vulva, and of the lowering of the clitoris by cutting ligaments that support it while preserving nerves and blood vessels. Wedge plasty is used to reconstruct a clitoral glans. Months of healing are required for the women to gain sensation in their newly exposed tissue.

Pierre Foldès continues his work despite repeated death threats.

In 2006 the book Victoire sur l’excision: Pierre Foldès, le chirurgien qui redonne l’espoir aux femmes mutilées by Hubert Prolongeau was released, which chronicles the work of Foldès. It won the Prix Essai France Télévisions for 2006, and was translated into English by Tobe Levin.

See also 
 Circumcision
 Foreskin restoration

References

French plastic surgeons
Hungarian surgeons
French people of Hungarian descent
Female genital mutilation
Living people
Hungarian humanitarians
Year of birth missing (living people)